Pheasant paste is a type of pâté made from pheasant meat and other common pâté ingredients such as sour cream, eggs, onions and butter.

See also
 List of spreads
 Pheasant under glass – a pheasant dish

References

Poultry dishes
Spreads (food)
Food paste